The Universidad Nacional de Asunción or Mbo'ehaovusu Tetãgua Paraguaygua, abbreviated UNA, anglicized as, The National University of Asuncion, is a public university founded in San Lorenzo, Paraguay. Founded in 1889, it is the oldest and most traditional university in the country.

History and evolution 

When the university first started, it consisted of only the Faculties of Law, Medicine and Mathematics, and schools of Clerical, Pharmacy and Obstetrics.

As of 2015, the UNA had 12 faculties and a number of institutes in 74 careers that take place in different areas of knowledge, offering students the most comprehensive range of vocational training opportunities. The academic community is made up of about 40,000 students and 6,200 teachers.

It also has several technology centers and research facilities for the academic community, both for conducting scientific research, and for the development of postgraduate studies, resulting in contributions to society.

Organization 
The university campus is spread throughout Paraguay, with centers in Pedro Juan Caballero, Caacupé, San Juan Bautista, Santa Rosa Misiones, Caazapá, Villarrica, Coronel Oviedo, Caaguazú, Paraguarí, Villa Hayes, San Pedro, San Estanislao, Cruce Los Pioneros (Boquerón) and Benjamín Aceval, in addition to the main campus in San Lorenzo and institutes in Asunción.

Schools 

UNA currently has twelve Schools:
 School of Chemical Sciences
 School of Medical Sciences
 School of Dentistry
 School of Engineering
 School of Law and Social Sciences
 School of Economic Sciences
 School of Philosophy
 School of Agrarian Sciences
 School of Veterinary Sciences
 Polytechnic School
 School of Architecture, Design and Art
 School of Exact and Natural Sciences

Institutes 

 Institute of Arts
 Institute of Languages
 Institute of Social Work

Publications
In the 2020s, the Higher Institute of Languages started publishing Ñemitỹrã, an academic journal on language, society, and education.

Notable alumni
 Eusebio Ayala, President of Paraguay
 Fatima Mereles
 Vicente Pistilli

Partner universities 
  Ching Yun University, Taiwan
  Taipei Medical University, Taiwan
  University of Rome, Italy

See also 

 List of universities in Paraguay

References

External links 
Official site (Spanish)
Official site (Guarani)

 
Educational institutions established in 1889
1889 establishments in Paraguay
San Lorenzo, Paraguay
Buildings and structures in Asunción